Analyst relations is a corporate strategy, corporate communications and marketing activity in which corporations communicate with ICT industry analysts (also known as research analysts) who work for independent research and consulting firms such as the Big Four accounting firms.

Analyst advice is often used by Fortune 1000 companies and others to determine the best option for major investment in ICT - especially where the deal is complex, changing, costly or critical. Top industry analysts have the power to make or break deals, thanks to their deep-rooted, subscription-based relationships with end-user technology buyers. Some analysts also focus on helping ICT firms to write request for proposal documents. Therefore, the strategy behind an effective Analyst Relations program is known as "influencing the influencers", a phrase coined by Omnicom Group's Brodeur agency in 2002.

Types and history 
Large corporations supplying technology (hardware, software, networking, and IT Services) usually have an Analyst Relations person or team (sometimes called industry relations). Corporate analyst relations functions are also found in the automotive, aerospace and telecommunications industries. In addition to in-house AR employees, there are a number of agencies offering specialized analyst relations support.

In 2004, Efrem Mallach listed four types of industry analysts: 
Scheduled. Market share forecasters follow set annual cycles.
Planned. These analysts plan research agendas several months in advance.
Event-driven. These analysts respond to current developments. 
Client-driven. These analysts, and also consultants and advisors in the same firms, apply existing knowledge to specific inquiries submitted by clients. 

The remit of an AR team is to ensure that industry analysts are briefed on a regular basis about their company's strategy, products, services and solutions, as well as their ability to execute in terms of global scale and go-to-market capabilities. In addition, ARs respond to research requests, and generally try to persuade these influential third parties to represent their organization in the best possible light.

Analyst Relations teams often report into a corporate communications function, although they can also report to marketing, investor relations, sales, or even directly to the CEO.

In June 2006, the Institute of Industry Analyst Relations was formed as a non-profit community of practice for Analyst Relations professionals and its members are both in-house and agency side AR professionals. Membership is closed to industry analysts.

See also
 Industry analyst
 Market research

References

Further reading 
 Influencer Relations: Insights in Analyst Value (2nd ed), Duncan Chapple, Sven Litke, Kea Company 2018 
 Win Them Over: A Survival Guide for Corporate Analyst Relations/Consultant Relations Programs (3rd ed.), Efrem Mallach, Folrose, 2013, 
 SIPR Analyst Relations guide
 Influencing the Influencers, William S Hopkins, Stephen England, Christopher Wilder, Knowledge Capital Group, 7 October 2006, 
 Getting Results from your Analyst Relations Strategies, Louis Columbus, iUniverse, 19 November 2004, 
 Industry Analyst Relations - An Extension to PR, Ralf Leinemann, Duncan Chapple, Folrose Ltd, 9 September 2008, 
 Up and to the RIGHT: Strategy and Tactics of Analyst Influence: A complete guide to analyst influence, Richard Stiennon, IT-Harvest Press, 1 May 2012,

External links
Institute of Industry Analyst Relations, professionals association founded in 2006

Public relations
Business terms